Northwest Africa 7034 is a Martian meteorite believed to be the second oldest yet discovered. It is estimated to be two billion years old and contains the most water of any Martian meteorite found on Earth. Although it is from Mars it does not fit into any of the three SNC meteorite categories, and forms a new Martian meteorite group named "Martian (basaltic breccia)". Nicknamed "Black Beauty", it was purchased in Morocco and a slice of it was donated to the University of New Mexico by its American owner.
The image (shown on the right) of the original NWA 7034 was photographed in 2012 by Carl Agee, University of New Mexico.

Discovery and naming
The meteorite was found in Rabt Sbayta, Ghredad Sabti region, Western Sahara, in the Sahara Desert in 2011, and was purchased in Morocco by a meteorite dealer who sold it to a collector in the United States, as Morocco does not have meteorite export control laws. Like all meteorites that are found in large numbers or sold at markets the name stands for the geographic region (Northwest Africa) and a number, which is given out consecutively. NWA 7034 carries the nickname "Black Beauty".

Description
NWA 7034 was originally described as a volcanic breccia that has a porphyritic appearance, consisting of plagioclase (andesine) and pyroxene (pigeonite and augite) phenocrysts that are up to 5 mm in diameter set in a fine grained groundmass. Accessory minerals include chlorapatite, chromite, goethite, ilmenite, magnetite, maghemite, alkali feldspar and pyrite. There are even some clasts present that are made of quenched magma. The groundmass is made from fine grained plagioclase, pyroxene, different oxide minerals, and traces of iron sulfides. The whole rock chemistry revealed that NWA 7034 has the highest water content ever measured in a Martian meteorite. The water might be derived from oceans that used to exist on Mars, but were still present when the volcanic rock, that would eventually become the meteorite, was erupted.

The meteorite contains components as old as 4.42 ± 0.07 Ga (billion years), and was heated during the Amazonian period of Mars. It is the second oldest Martian meteorite known. However, a team of Japanese researchers who studied the meteorite concluded that water on Mars originated around 4.4 billion years ago.

Classification
NWA 7034 is the first Martian meteorite that is a breccia and does not fall in any of the known Martian meteorite groups (shergottite, nakhlite, chassignite and ALH 84001). NWA 7034 was classified as an ungrouped planetary achondrite until the Meteoritical Society approved the new designation "Martian (basaltic breccia)" in January 2013. The iron/manganese ratio is consistent with that of other Martian meteorites, but the oxygen isotopes do not correlate with a Martian origin. The change in oxygen isotope ratios could be explained by removal or addition of heavier or lighter isotopes, or by mixing with a mass with a different isotopic ratio. This could happen during aqueous alteration of the Martian crust. Another explanation would be an isotopic contamination of the Martian crust during impact brecciation.

In 2018 the Nomenclature Committee of the Meteoritical Society accepted a petition to reclassify the NWA 7034 pairing group as "Martian (polymict breccia)". The older term, "basaltic breccia," was held to be unsuitable because the stones contain a variety of clast types, including impact melts, sedimentary rocks, and a wide variety of other lithologies.

Origin 
A 2022 study concluded that it had been ejected into space by the impact that formed the crater Karratha about 5-10 million years ago in the Terra Cimmeria-Terra Sirenum region of the southern highlands of Mars. The authors proposed that the meteorite represented the impact ejecta of the nearby Khujirt crater, which formed about 1.5 billion years ago.

See also
 Glossary of meteoritics
 List of Martian meteorites
 List of meteorites on Mars

References

Book sources

External links
Northwest Africa 7034 via The Meteoritical Society - Database entry of the Meteoritical Society

Martian meteorites
Meteorites found in Northwest Africa